Christmas in the Caribbean is a 2022 romantic comedy film directed by Philippe Martinez and written by Martinez and Nathalie Cox. It stars Elizabeth Hurley, Caroline Quentin, Nathalie Cox, Edoardo Costa and Stephanie Beacham and was released digitally and in cinemas on 5 December 2022.

Synopsis
Rejected at the altar, Rachel (Hurley) and her two best friends (Quentin and Cox) turn what would have been her honeymoon into a holiday of a lifetime to a Caribbean island; whilst there, Rachel falls in love with Alessandro (Costa), however Alessandro's family have other ideas.

Cast
 Elizabeth Hurley as Rachel
 Caroline Quentin as Amanda
 Nathalie Cox as Rebecca
 Edoardo Costa as Alessandro
 Downtown Julie Brown as Ellie
 Stephanie Beacham as Chloe
 Ray Fearon as Gregory
 Hadar Cats as	Monica
 Rafael Martinez as Rafael
 Winston Crooke as	Winston
 Danielle Browne as Tasha
 Vaughn Anslyn	as Bastian
 Frank Corbie	as Frank
 Nikeeva Elliott as Nikeeva
 Andrea Browne	as Andrea
 Vishan David as David

Production
The film was announced on 26 October 2021 with principal photography beginning later that week. The ,majority of scenes were filmed in the Kittitian Hill resort in Saint Kitts and Nevis. Christmas in the Caribbean was released on 5 December 2022.

References

External links

2022 films
2022 comedy films
2022 romance films
2020s English-language films